Sun Ruiping (born ) is a Chinese weightlifter, competing in the 75 kg category and representing China at international competitions. She competed at world championships, most recently at the 2002 World Weightlifting Championships.

She set a new world record in the Clean & Jerk with 152.5 kg and also a new world record with a total score of 270.0 kg, both on 7 October 2002 in Busan, South Korea.

Major results

References

1981 births
Living people
Chinese female weightlifters
Place of birth missing (living people)
World record setters in weightlifting
Weightlifters at the 2002 Asian Games
Asian Games medalists in weightlifting
Asian Games gold medalists for China
World Weightlifting Championships medalists
Medalists at the 2002 Asian Games
20th-century Chinese women
21st-century Chinese women